Swing Symphony is an American animated musical short film series produced by Walter Lantz Productions from 1941 to 1945. The shorts were a more contemporary pastiche on Walt Disney's Silly Symphonies, and often featured top boogie-woogie musicians of the era. While the first cartoon include the characters Woody Woodpecker and Andy Panda, it mainly features a variety of different characters created exclusively for the series, with Oswald the Lucky Rabbit making an appearance in one cartoon.

Background
Walter Lantz Productions first developed the format with Scrub Me Mama with a Boogie Beat, released on March 28, 1941. The short is considered a precursor as it contains many elements seen in the series, such as utilizing a popular boogie-woogie song. Lantz also produced Boogie Woogie Bugle Boy of Company 'B''' later in September which followed the same formula, and would be nominated for an Academy Award. The first cartoon that would go under Swing Symphony wouldn't be released until December of that year.

One of the main writers that worked on the series was Ben Hardaway, who left Warner Bros. in 1940 and was hired by Walter Lantz to work on the storyboards for Universal Studios' cartoons. From 1938 to 1940, Hardaway was notably one of the last holdouts to co-direct several Merrie Melodies cartoons that featured lengthy musical sequences. He also supplied his voice for Woody Woodpecker in 1944 until 1949. Darrell Calker who was involved in jazz circles, composed the music and brought in famous musicians like Nat King Cole, Meade Lux Lewis and Jack Teagarden to play them. Pianist Bob Zurke did a recording for the cartoon Jungle Jive before he died aged 32.

In 1942, Juke Box Jamboree was nominated for an Academy Award for Best Animated Short Film but lost to Disney's Der Fuehrer's Face. Few of Lantz's cartoons were highlighted for stereotyping and racism, but were said by Joe Adamson as not intended to be offensive.

The series was discontinued in 1945 due to swing music fading in popularity following the end of World War II. Dick Lundy, who directed the last Swing Symphony cartoon, later developed Musical Miniatures'', a musical series focusing on classical music. Four cartoons were produced in 1947–1948.

Filmography

See also
Walter Lantz Productions
Silly Symphony

References

External links
Swing Symphony at IMDB
Swing Symphony at BCDB

Film series introduced in 1941
Animated film series
1940s English-language films
Walter Lantz Productions shorts
Walter Lantz Productions cartoons and characters